Samuel Stephen Mantom (born 20 February 1992) is an English footballer who plays as a midfielder for Rushall Olympic.

Club career

West Bromwich Albion
Mantom began his career as a youth player for Walsall's academy before being spotted by West Bromwich Albion. The Baggies reportedly paid £20,000 to bring him to The Hawthorns.

After regularly appearing for the Baggies' reserve side, Mantom was handed a professional deal by the club. He joined Icelandic side Haukar on 14 May 2010. Mantom made seven appearances for the newly promoted Úrvalsdeild side, scoring twice.

He made his debut for West Brom in the Football League Cup game against Leyton Orient at Brisbane Road on 24 August 2010, which ended in a 2–0 win for the Baggies.

On 23 November 2010 he joined Tranmere Rovers on a month–long emergency loan. Mantom made his debut on the same day in a 1–0 defeat against Hartlepool United.

On 17 February 2011 he joined Oldham Athletic on a month–long emergency loan. On 19 February 2011, Mantom made his debut for the Latics in a 1–0 defeat against Bristol Rovers. Mantom made four goalless appearances before returning to his parent club.

Walsall

On 6 March 2012, Mantom signed for Football League One side Walsall on loan. Mantom scored on his debut for the Saddlers on the same day in a 3–2 victory over Sheffield United. On 17 March 2012, Mantom scored his second goal for the club in a 2–1 defeat against Yeovil Town. Mantom netted the winning goal in a 3–2 win against Chestefield on 7 April 2012 as the Saddlers narrowly avoided relegation.

Mantom returned to Walsall on loan on 9 November 2012. He scored his first goal of his second loan spell in a 2–1 defeat against Leyton Orient on 29 December 2012.

On 11 January 2013, Mantom made his loan move to Walsall permanent, joining on a free transfer after West Brom agreed to cancel his contract with the club. Mantom signed an 18-month contract with the Saddlers. Mantom scored his second goal of the season in a 3–1 victory over Bournemouth on 19 January 2013. Despite a strong second half of the season that lifted Walsall into play-off contention, the Saddlers eventually finished ninth in League One.

Mantom scored his first goal of the 2013–14 season on 21 September 2013 in a 1–1 draw against Rotherham United. He netted his second goal of the season on 22 October 2013 as the Saddlers beat Swindon at the County Ground. Mantom signed a new two–and–a–half–year deal with the club on 15 November 2013. He then scored the only goal of the game in a 1–0 victory over former club Oldham on 14 January 2014 . He netted his fourth goal of the season on 22 February 2014 against Crawley as the Saddlers slipped to a 2–1 defeat. Mantom scored his fifth goal of the season and was sent off for the first time in his professional career in his next game as Walsall lost 2–1 at Preston North End on 1 March 2014. Mantom was rewarded for an impressive campaign at the end of the season by being named the Saddlers' Player of the Year.

Mantom suffered a knee injury during pre–season training and was sidelined for several of the opening weeks of the 2014–15 season. He eventually made his first appearance of the season as a late substitute in Walsall's 1–0 defeat against Crawley on 21 October 2014. However, a recurrence of Mantom's original injury saw him undergo knee surgery in January 2015.

Scunthorpe United
In June 2016, he signed for League One side Scunthorpe United on a free transfer signing a three-year contract, after turning down a new deal at Walsall. He scored his first goal for Scunthorpe against Chesterfield on 22 October 2016.

Southend United
In June 2018, Mantom signed for League One side Southend United for an undisclosed fee.

Rushall Olympic
Mantom signed for Southern League Premier Division Central side Rushall Olympic on 16 October 2020.

Hemel Hempstead
Mantom signed for National League South side Hemel Hempstead Town on 27 November 2020.

Rushall Olympic return
In June 2022, Mantom returned to Rushall Olympic.

International career
Mantom is a former England under-17 international.

Career statistics

Honours
Individual
Walsall Player of the Year: 2013–14

References

External links

WBA profile
Sam: I will miss Iceland

1992 births
Living people
Sportspeople from Stourbridge
English footballers
Association football midfielders
Tranmere Rovers F.C. players
West Bromwich Albion F.C. players
Oldham Athletic A.F.C. players
Walsall F.C. players
Scunthorpe United F.C. players
Southend United F.C. players
Rushall Olympic F.C. players
English Football League players